is a Japanese voice actress and singer affiliated with Ken Production. Her major roles include Tsukasa in .hack, Maria Ross in Fullmetal Alchemist,  Rossiu Adai in Gurren Lagann, MakubeX in GetBackers, Wolfram von Bielefeld in Kyo Kara Maoh!, Chie Harada in My-Hime and My-Otome,
Teito Klein in 07-Ghost, Jomy Marcus Shin in Toward the Terra, and the eponymous character in Jing: King of Bandits. Her deep voice is used to play male or masculine female characters. She won a Best Supporting Actress Award at the 2nd Seiyu Awards for her work in Moyasimon: Tales of Agriculture, Gurren Lagann, and Toward the Terra. She also won the Overseas Fan Award at the 4th Seiyu Awards for her portrayals of Wolfram in Kyo Kara Maoh! and Souji Okita in Peacemaker Kurogane. As the band Mitsuki Saiga feat. Just, she released several albums and singles that have charted on Oricon.

Filmography

Television animation

Movies

Tokusatsu

Video games

Overseas dubbing

Discography

Albums

Character albums

Singles

Audio dramas

References

External links
 Ken Production profile 
 Mitsuki Saiga's Paradise Heaven Web Radio 
 Mitsuki Saiga at GamePlaza-Haruka- Voice Acting DataBase 
 Mitsuki Saiga at Hitoshi Doi's Seiyuu Database
 
 
 The Japan Foundation Center for Cultural Exchange in Vietnam：Voice Actress's Songs and Voice Heard across the Border - Mitsuki Saiga feat. Just Talk & Mini Live Show at Wochi Kochi Magazine
 

1973 births
Living people
Voice actresses from Saitama Prefecture
Japanese contraltos
Japanese video game actresses
Japanese voice actresses
21st-century Japanese actresses
21st-century Japanese women singers
21st-century Japanese singers
Ken Production voice actors